Frederic Augustus Lucas, Sc.D. (March 25, 1852 – February 9, 1929) was a zoologist who served as a curator of the Brooklyn Museum and director of the American Museum of Natural History. He was an expert on the osteology and anatomy of birds.

Biography

Career
Frederic A. Lucas was prominent in the Great American Museum movement, which sought to bring Natural Science to the American public. He eventually became Curator in Chief of the Brooklyn Museum, in Brooklyn, New York, (1904) and subsequently enjoyed an appointment as director at the American Museum of Natural History in Manhattan (1911).

Formative years

The son of Augustus Henry, a merchant seaman who was captain of a sailing vessel, he accompanied his father on two long voyages, the first (1861-1862) at the age of 9 and the second (1869-1870) when he was 17. His mother was Eliza Oliver, and his paternal great-grandmother Ruby Fuller was a descendant of Dr Samuel Fuller on the Mayflower. He became fascinated with sea life, especially the marine birds, many of which he was able to snare, skin and prepare as mounted specimens. From this he developed an ambition to become a taxidermist and entered Ward's Natural Science Establishment at Rochester, New York, to learn the techniques involved. Perhaps because of the manner of his development he seems to have had little regard for investigative science per se. As a consequence, he had little opportunity for formal education and he never sought any. After the 11 years he spent at Ward's, he bragged that, "during those days he never read through any scientific book, never attended a course of scientific lectures, never did an hour's laboratory work, nor made a microscope slide", his interests being confined to avian osteology and the mounting and tagging of specimens for exhibition. He also claimed that sharks were essentially incapable of attacking man. Yet his competency in this area was sufficient to provide him an appointment to mount and prepare avian specimens at the National Museum of Natural History in Washington, DC (1882) at the age of 21 where he was given the title of Curator.

Legacy
Lucas came to be recognized by his contemporaries as an authority on ancient animals. His description of himself was that of "all round" naturalist, a type specimen he regarded regretfully as fast disappearing. Because of his associations at the National Museum he was able to meet and associate with many men of this type, Hornaday, Akeley, Ward, Howell, etc., people whose recognition was based on their writings as explorers rather than as academicians. He never regarded as himself as deficient in that respect. After instruction in the techniques of scientific writing and manuscript preparation by a friend early in his career, he published more than 350 articles, primarily in the area of avian osteology but also relating to natural history and the role of the museum and public education.

Death
Frederic Lucas died on February 9, 1929, at his home in Flushing, New York at the age of 76. He was buried at Plymouth, Massachusetts. He was married to Annie Edgar from 1884 and they had two daughters.

References

Further reading
 Lucas, F.A., 1897 The Florida monster. Science, vol. V, no. 116 :476 (March 8 ). 
 Lucas, Frederic A., Meteorites, Meteors and Shooting Stars, Guide Leaflet Series No. 4, The American Museum of Natural History, New York, 1926.  
 Lucas, F. A. 1928. Some mistakes of scientists. Natural History, 28 [2]: 169-174. (March–April).
Lucas, F. A. 1933. Fifty Years of Museum Work: Autobiography, Unpublished Papers, and Bibliography.
 Palmer W. Smithsonian Memo to Dall 2/16/1897. 
 Verrill A. H. 1916. The ocean and its mysteries. Duffield & Co New York; Verrill AH. 1962 Reprint of the 1948 edition. The strange story of our earth. Duffield & Co New York.

External links 
 Frederic Augustus Lucas Papers
 Searchable Ornithological Research Archive
 
 
 
 

1852 births
1929 deaths
American curators
American non-fiction writers
Directors of museums in the United States
People from Plymouth, Massachusetts
Writers from New York City